Arjun Basu is a Canadian writer. He has published two award-nominated books, and is also known for his Twitter feed, on which he posts flash fiction branded as "Twisters".

Born and raised in Montreal to immigrant parents from India, Basu published his debut short story collection Squishy in 2008. The book was shortlisted for the ReLit Awards in 2009. His novel Waiting for the Man was published in 2014, and was a longlisted nominee for that year's Scotiabank Giller Prize.

References

21st-century Canadian novelists
21st-century Canadian short story writers
Canadian male novelists
Canadian male short story writers
Canadian writers of Asian descent
Canadian people of Indian descent
Canadian people of Bengali descent
Writers from Montreal
Living people
21st-century Canadian male writers
Year of birth missing (living people)
Shorty Award winners